The International Federation of Agricultural Producers (IFAP), ( (FIPA)) was an organization that advocated on the international level for member farm organizations. Established in 1946, the organization was liquidated by the French Tribunal de Grande Instance in a judgement made on 4 November 2010, to proceed with the liquidation of IFAP after an economic and political crisis. The Federation had gone through severe financial problems.

IFAP represented over 600 million farm families grouped in 120 national organizations in 79 countries. It was a global network in which farmers from industrialized and developing countries exchanged concerns and set common priorities. IFAP was founded in 1946 to advocate farmers' interests at the international level, and had General Consultative Status with the Economic and Social Council of the United Nations.

The IFAP is succeeded by the Rome-based World Farmers' Organization (WFO).

References

External links
 Reaction to liquidation (individual reaction)
 Reaction from Irish Farmers' Association to liquidation

Agricultural organizations based in France
Farmers' organizations